Crociale is a village (curazia) located in San Marino. It belongs to the municipality (castello) of Fiorentino.

Geography
The village, sometimes named Crociale di Fiorentino, is located between Murata and Fiorentino, on a main road linking the city of San Marino to Mercatino Conca, in Italy.

See also
Fiorentino
Capanne
Pianacci

References

Curazie in San Marino
Fiorentino